Anuraadha Tewari (born 11 August 1971) is a well known Indian Writer, Director and Creative Force working in the Media Industry of Mumbai. A Gold Medalist in Film Making from Jamia Milia Islamia with a Masters in Mass Comm,  Anuraadha has worked extensively across all Media platforms, as both a Creative Artiste as well as a Creative Head of Companies for the last 25 years.  In 2017, Anuraadha set up India's first set of Writer's Rooms under the umbrella academy 'Kosen Rufu' that works extensively with various OTT Platforms, Film Studios as well as TV channels across the Country. She also conducts a Certification Course in Screenwriting across the World. Most celebrated for writing the Story and Screenplay of Award winning Films like   Fashion (2008), Jail (2010), and Heroine (2012), Anuraadha's scripts won the leading ladies Priyanka Chopra and Kangana Ranaut a National Award each. The Web Series Laakhon Mein Ek (Season 2) on Amazon Prime won her a nomination in the first ever SWA Awards of which she was also a Jury Member. Working prolifically across genres, Anuraadha is known for her passion for #ConsciousCreativity and a desire to train younger, fresher Creative Minds to focus on Stories as a Healing Tool.

Biography

Education 
ISC, Welham Girls' School, Topper, ISC Commerce B Com (Hons) Lady Shri Ram College, New Delhi President, Students Union MA Mass Communication MCRC, Jamia Millia Islamia, New Delhi Topper, the Class of '95.

Career graph
With a master's degree and a Gold Medal in Film Direction from the prestigious Film School of Jamia, Millia Islamia, New Delhi, Anuraadha began her career as a Chief Assistant to Mahesh Bhatt and worked with him on 3 Films followed by a long stint as an independent Writer Director for Anupam Kher's Media based Company and was acknowledged as the youngest Director in India at the time by the mainstream Press for having directed some path breaking shows and events for TV.  Thereafter, she has worked as the Supervising Producer of Channel V, the CEO of a Cinema-based portal by the Walchand group, the Creative Business Strategist for Astral Star Asia as well Vogue Entertainment, ending her corporate stint with the role of the National Creative Director, Crest Communications. Getting back to pure creatives in 2002,she worked As a Story – Screenplay Writer on Prakash Jha's 'Rahul', 'Yaadein' by Subhash Ghai and 'Supari' by Padam Kumar. Starting in 2004, she has written 12 successful Television Shows ending with 'Seven' a 26 part super hero series for Yashraj Films aired on Sony, followed by the story and screenplay of the award-winning 'Fashion' (2008) 'Jail' and Heroine (2012) all 3 directed by Madhur Bhandarkar. In 2017, she created KOSEN-RUFU, a Company that collaborates with Writers from across the world, to work as a Writers' Room on various Projects. She is also the Curator of Film Festivals and has her own Certification Course in Screenwriting that are conducted in various Countries.

Filmography 

Chief Assistant Director to Mahesh Bhatt
‘Papa Kehte Hain’

Story Screenplay Writer
‘Rahul’
Directed by Prakash Jha

Story Screenplay Writer
‘Fashion’
Directed by Madhur Bhandarkar

Story Screenplay Writer
‘Jail’
Directed by Madhur Bhandarkar

Story Screenplay Writer
‘Heroine’
Directed by Madhur Bhandarkar

Creative entrepreneur 

" Founder": Kosen-Rufu
(Specialised Writers'Rooms for Content Development)

" Teacher": Story as a Healer: Foundations of Screenwriting'''
(A Certification Course)

"Curator": The Changing Narrative 
(A Travelling Film Festival)

Writer TV / web series 

 Yeh Meri Life Hai (Sony)
 Hum 2 Hain Na (Sony)
 Saaksshi (Sony)
 Shararat (Star Plus)
 Jab Love Hua (Zee)
 Kaajjal (Sony)
 Jeete Hain Jisske Liye (Sony)
 Dhoom Machaao Dhoom (Disney)
 Chhoona Hai Aasmaan (Star One)
 Salaam Zindagi (Sony)
 Yahaan ke Hum Sikandar (Zee Next)
 Seven (YRF – Sony)
 Ek Hazaaron mein Meri Behnaa Hai (Star Plus)
 Humsafars (Sony)
 2612 (Life Ok)
 Crazy, Stupid, Ishq (Channel V)
 O Gujariya (Channel V)
 Adhuuri Humaari Kahaani (& TV)
 Qubool Hai - Season 5 (Zee)
 Girls On Top (MTV)
 Savdhaan India (TV series) (Life Ok)
 Laakhon Mein Ek - Season 2 (Web series) (Amazon)

Director 

Writer-Director
‘A Silent Love Story’
India's First Silent Comedy
Star Plus

Writer-Director
‘Kirron Kher Today’
A Talk Show on Taboo Topics
Star Plus

Writer-Director
‘Take Off’
India's First Live Action Animation Series
Sony

Writer-Director
‘Good Shot’
A Film Magazine Show for Television
Sony

Specials 

Creative Director & Copywriter
Kiah Diamond Jewelry TVC
(For Sushmita Sen's Production)

Writer –Director
Special Promos for 'Viruddh' the film
Star TV, AB Corp and Satyajeet Movies

Creative Director / Head of Programming 

 Anupam Kher's Media Entertainment Co.
Apart from Writing and Directing her own shows on TV
Was responsible for launching and supervising 9 Shows
On Star Plus, Sony, Zee as well as DD 1.

 Vogue Communications Pvt. Ltd.
Set up the Creative Strategy of the Co. as well as launched its maiden
venture 'Tere Liye' directed by Sanjay Gadhvi

Channel V
As Supervising Producer was responsible for several teams of Producers,
Assistant Producers and Production Executives.
Was creatively responsible for 7 Shows on air

 The Walchand Group
CEO, 3to6.com – a sister concern of cricketnext.com
Was responsible for setting up the co., creating manpower resources,
creating creative strategy as well as content with the additional responsibility
of Marketing and PR.

Crest Communications Ltd.
As National Creative Director was responsible for setting up the Films and
TV Division in Crest Bombay, New Delhi as well Singapore

 Astral Star, Malaysia
Set up the India Branch of the Malaysian Co. which deals with Film
Acquisition as well as Co-Production

Events 

Director, Lata Mangeshkar Live in Concert – the First,
1997

Director, The 3rd Screen Awards, 1998

Director, The 7th Zee Cine Awards, 2001

Writer Director, Filmfare Awards
A series of Curtain Raisers on its Golden Jubilee,
2005

Writer-Director, Indian Idol Special,
Singers in Aid of Tsunami Relief, 2006

Writer-Director, The Holi Concert for Sony,
2006

Writer Director, Zee Diwaali Dhamaaka
Zee 2006

Writer Director, Aap Jaisa Koi Awards,
A 10 episode Award Series on Sony, 2006

Additional Experience 

Guest Lecturer, 
NID, 
Ahmedabad

Guest Lecturer,
EMRC
Pune

Guest Lecturer,
XIC
Bombay

Guest Lecturer
The Writers' Workshop
Bombay

Special Correspondent,
Zee Premier Magazine,
Bombay

Columnist,
The Middles Section,
Times of India,
New Delhi

Columnist,
The Sun Magazine,
New Delhi

Writer-Producer-Radio Jockey
AIR FM,
New Delhi

References

External links
 
 Official Facebook Fan Page 

1971 births
Living people
Indian women screenwriters
Writers from Varanasi
Indian television writers
Delhi University alumni
Jamia Millia Islamia alumni
Indian women television directors
Indian television directors
Indian women television writers
Hindi screenwriters
Women writers from Uttar Pradesh
Screenwriters from Uttar Pradesh
Businesspeople from Varanasi
Businesswomen from Uttar Pradesh